Three Wise Men is an alternative term for the Biblical Magi.

Three Wise Men may also refer to:

 Three Wise Men (2008 film), 2008 Finnish film
 Three Wise Men (2016 film), 2016 Nigerian film
 The 3 Wise Men, 2003 Spanish animated film
 Three Wise Men (cocktail), drink made from mixing three different whiskeys
 Three Wise Men (volcanoes), row of three underwater volcanoes located in the Pacific Ocean
 Three Wise Men of Gotham, early name given to the people of the village of Gotham, Nottinghamshire
 Three Wise Men of the East (professional wrestling), term for three managers in the WWF during the 1970s and 1980s — Ernie Roth, Lou Albano, and Freddie Blassie
 Three Wise Men (Canadian politics), nickname for Quebec intellectuals Jean Marchand, Gérard Pelletier, and Pierre Trudeau, who were elected to Parliament in 1965
 Three Wise Men, a "lifeline" in the Who Wants to Be a Millionaire? franchise

See also
Wise men